is a Japanese equestrian.

"Yoshi", as he is known, began riding as a junior high school student and took up eventing at University. In 2001 Yoshi he moved to the UK in order to pursue eventing trained by Andrew Hoy and in 2009 he moved to Germany. He now trains with German rider Dirk Schrade.

He earned Best Equestrian Athlete; award at the Japanese sports awards in 2005, ’07 and ‘11.

Yoshi comes from a family of Olympians; his aunt was an international figure skater and is now an Olympic judge and his uncle won a silver medal in swimming at the Rome Olympic Games.

Competition 
At the 2008 Summer Olympics, he finished in 49th in the individual eventing.  There was no Japanese team.

At the 2012 Summer Olympics he competed in the individual eventing and team eventing.  After finishing top in the dressage phase of the individual competition, he was eliminated after the cross-country section.

At the 2017 Badminton Horse Trials he finished in 8th place with The Duke Of Cavan

In June 2017 he became the first Japanese rider to win a CCI*** competition outside Japan when he won the Bramham Horse Trials, in Yorkshire, England.

References

External links
 
 Images of Yoshiaki Oiwa competing in 2017.

Japanese male equestrians
1976 births
Living people
Equestrians at the 2008 Summer Olympics
Equestrians at the 2012 Summer Olympics
Equestrians at the 2016 Summer Olympics
Olympic equestrians of Japan
Equestrians at the 2006 Asian Games
Equestrians at the 2010 Asian Games
Equestrians at the 2018 Asian Games
Asian Games gold medalists for Japan
Asian Games silver medalists for Japan
Asian Games bronze medalists for Japan
Asian Games medalists in equestrian
Medalists at the 2006 Asian Games
Medalists at the 2010 Asian Games
Medalists at the 2018 Asian Games
Equestrians at the 2020 Summer Olympics